Andreja Klepač and María Teresa Torró Flor were the defending champions, but they chose not to participate this year.

Kiki Bertens and Johanna Larsson won the title, defeating Tatjana Maria and Olga Savchuk in the final, 7–5, 6–4.

Seeds

Draw

External Links
 Draw

Swedish Open - Women's Doubles
2015 in Swedish women's sport
Swedish Open